Benzoyl peroxide is a chemical compound (specifically, an organic peroxide) with structural formula  , often abbreviated as (BzO)2.  In terms of its structure, the molecule can be described as two benzoyl (Bz) groups connected by a peroxide.  It is a white granular  solid with a faint odour of benzaldehyde, poorly soluble in water but soluble in acetone, ethanol, and many other organic solvents. Benzoyl peroxide is an oxidizer, but it is principally used as in the production of polymers.

Benzoyl peroxide is mainly used in production of plastics and for bleaching flour, hair, plastics and textiles.

Synthesis, structure, and chemical reactivity 

The original 1858 synthesis by Liebig reacted benzoyl chloride with barium peroxide, a reaction described by the following idealized equation:

Benzoyl peroxide is usually prepared by treating hydrogen peroxide with benzoyl chloride under alkaline conditions.

As in many other peroxides, the C-O-O-C linkage has a dihedral angle near 90°.

The oxygen–oxygen bond in peroxides is weak, although this weakness is not indicated by the O-O bond distance.. Thus, benzoyl peroxide undergoes homolysis (symmetrical fission), forming free radicals:

The symbol • indicates that the products are radicals; i.e., they contain at least one unpaired electron. Such species are highly reactive. The homolysis is usually induced by heating. The half-life of benzoyl peroxide is one hour at 92 °C. At 131 °C, the half-life is one minute.

It has long been known that the compound has oxidizing properties.  This property led to the use of BPO to treat various skin conditions, including burns, chronic varicose leg tumors, and tinea sycosis. He also reported animal experiments that showed the relatively low toxicity of the compound.

Treatment with benzoyl peroxide was proposed for wounds by Lyon and Reynolds in 1929, and for sycosis vulgaris and acne varioliformis by Peck and Chagrin in 1934. However, preparations were often of questionable quality.  It was officially approved for the treatment of acne in the US in 1960.

Uses

Polymerization
Benzoyl peroxide is mainly used as a radical initiator to induce chain-growth polymerization reactions, such as for polyester and poly(methyl methacrylate) (PMMA) resins and dental cements and restoratives. It is the most important among the various organic peroxides used for this purpose, a relatively safe alternative to the much more hazardous methyl ethyl ketone peroxide.  It is also used in rubber curing and as a finishing agent for some acetate yarns.

Other uses 

Benzoyl peroxide is effective for treating acne lesions. It does not induce antibiotic resistance. It may be combined with salicylic acid, sulfur, erythromycin, or clindamycin (antibiotics), or adapalene (a synthetic retinoid).  Two common combination drugs include benzoyl peroxide/clindamycin and adapalene/benzoyl peroxide, adapalene being a chemically stable retinoid that can be combined with benzoyl peroxide unlike Tazarotene and tretinoin. Combination products such as benzoyl peroxide/clindamycin and benzoyl peroxide/salicylic acid appear to be slightly more effective than benzoyl peroxide alone for the treatment of acne lesions. The combination tretinoin/benzoyl peroxide was approved for medical use in the United States in 2021.

Benzoyl peroxide for acne treatment is typically applied to the affected areas in gel, cream, or liquid, in concentrations of 2.5% increasing through 5.0%, and up to 10%. No strong evidence supports the idea that higher concentrations of benzoyl peroxide are more effective than lower concentrations.

Like most peroxides, it is a powerful bleaching agent. It has been used for the bleaching of flour, fats, oils, waxes, and cheeses, as well as a stain remover for ink stains on dolls.

Mechanism of action 
Classically, benzoyl peroxide is thought to have a three-fold activity in treating acne. It is sebostatic, comedolytic, and inhibits growth of  Cutibacterium acnes, the main bacterium associated with acne.  In general, acne vulgaris is a hormone-mediated inflammation of sebaceous glands and hair follicles. Hormone changes cause an increase in keratin and sebum production, leading to blocked drainage. C. acnes has many lytic enzymes that break down the proteins and lipids in the sebum, leading to an inflammatory response. The free-radical reaction of benzoyl peroxide can break down the keratin, therefore unblocking the drainage of sebum (comedolytic). It can cause nonspecific peroxidation of C. acnes, making it bactericidal, and it was thought to decrease sebum production, but  disagreement exists within the literature on this.

Some evidence suggests that benzoyl peroxide has an anti-inflammatory effect as well. In micromolar concentrations it prevents neutrophils from releasing reactive oxygen species, part of the inflammatory response in acne.

As a medication, benzoyl peroxide is mostly used to treat acne, either alone or in combination with other treatments. Some versions are sold mixed with antibiotics such as clindamycin. It is on the WHO List of Essential Medicines, and, in the US, it is available as an over-the-counter and generic medication. It is also used in dentistry for teeth whitening.

Side effects

Application of benzoyl peroxide to the skin may result in redness, burning, and irritation. This side effect is dose-dependent.

Because of these possible side effects, it is recommended to start with a low concentration and build up as appropriate, as the skin gradually develops tolerance to the medication. Skin sensitivity typically resolves after a few weeks of continuous use. Irritation can also be reduced by avoiding harsh facial cleansers and wearing sunscreen prior to sun exposure.

One in 500 people experience hypersensitivity to BPO and are liable to experience burning, itching, crusting, and possibly swelling.  About one-third of people experience phototoxicity under exposure to ultraviolet (UVB) light.

Other uses
As a bleach, it has been used as a medication and a water disinfectant. In specialized contexts, the name may be abbreviated as BPO.

Benzoyl peroxide is used in dentistry as a tooth whitening product.

Safety

Explosion hazard
Benzoyl peroxide is potentially explosive like other organic peroxides, and can cause fires without external ignition. The hazard is acute for the pure material, so the compound is generally used as a solution or a paste. For example, cosmetics contain only a small percentage of benzoyl peroxide and pose no explosion risk.

Toxicity
Benzoyl peroxide breaks down in contact with skin, producing benzoic acid and oxygen, neither of which is very toxic.

With regards to BPO's carcinogenic potential, one study concluded, "caution should be recommended in the use of this and other free radical-generating compounds". A 1999 IARC review of carcinogenicity studies found no evidence linking BPO acne medication to skin cancers in humans.  However, some animal studies found that the compound could act as a carcinogen and enhance the effect of known carcinogens.

Skin irritation
In a 1977 study using a human maximization test, 76% of subjects acquired a contact sensitization to benzoyl peroxide. Formulations of 5% and 10% were used.

The U.S. National Institute for Occupational Safety and Health has developed criteria for a recommended standard for occupational exposure to benzoyl peroxide.

Cloth staining

Contact with fabrics or hair, such as from still-moist acne medication, can cause permanent color dampening almost immediately. Even secondary contact can cause bleaching, for example, contact with a towel that has been used to wash off benzoyl peroxide-containing hygiene products.

Use During Pregnancy 
The use of topical benzoyl peroxide has not been studied during breastfeeding. Because only about 5% is absorbed following topical application, it is considered a low risk to the nursing infant. However, it is important to ensure that the infant's skin does not come into direct contact with the areas of skin that have been treated. Only water-miscible cream or gel products should be applied to the breast because ointments may expose the infant to high levels of mineral paraffins via licking.

References

External links 
 

Organic Peroxide Producers Safety Division (OPPSD)

Anti-acne preparations
Benzene derivatives
IARC Group 3 carcinogens
Organic peroxides
Radical initiators
Wikipedia medicine articles ready to translate
World Health Organization essential medicines